The paraconical pendulum is a type of pendulum invented in the 1950s by Maurice Allais, a French researcher. During the 1950s, Maurice Allais conducted six marathon series of long-term observations, during each of which his team manually operated and manually monitored his pendulum non-stop over about a month. The objective was to investigate possible changes over time of the characteristics of the motion, hypothesized to yield information about asymmetries of inertial space (sometimes described as "aether flow").

Characterization and experiments
The defining feature of the "paraconical" or "ball-borne" pendulum is that the pendulum's fulcrum is the changing point of contact between a spherical metal ball and a flat surface on which the ball rests. The pendulum therefore loses energy to rolling friction but not sliding friction, and is able to swing freely in both dimensions (forward-backward and side-to-side), similar to an ordinary conical pendulum. The main difference between a paraconical pendulum and an ordinary conical pendulum is the size of the ball involved: shrinking the ball down to a point produces an ordinary conical pendulum.

Typically a paraconical pendulum is built as a solid body with a stiff rod, rather than with a flexible wire or cord. If an accurately spherical ball and an accurately planar flat are used, a paraconical pendulum is a highly sensitive instrument.

As with the conical Foucault pendulum, a paraconical pendulum will be affected by the rotation of the Earth; but the changing fulcrum point makes the behavior of this dynamical system rather more complex. As first noted by Allais, and now confirmed by modern researchers, its motion exhibits a 24.8-hour cyclic pattern.

See also
 Allais effect, a claim asserted by Maurice Allais of anomalous behavior of his pendulum during a partial solar eclipse in 1954
 Double pendulum

External links
 Göde Wissenschafts Stiftung Website: Description of recent experiments with a modern automated paraconical pendulum.
 Video of another modern automatic paraconical pendulum.
 Maurice Allais, Ten Notes published (in French) in the Proceedings of the French Academy of Sciences (Comptes Rendus des Seances de l'Academie des Sciences), dated 4/11/57, 13/11/57, 18/11/57, 13/5/57, 4/12/57, 25/11/57, 3/11/58, 22/12/58, 9/2/59, and 19/1/59, some translated into English.
 

Pendulums